Project America was the designation for a contract between American Classic Voyages and the Litton Ingalls Shipyard of Pascagoula, Mississippi.  The contract was to build two cruise ships, with a gross tonnage of 72,000 each, with an option for a third vessel.  The contract had the initial potential value of $1.4 billion U.S. dollars. The first ordered ship would go on to be completed as the Pride of America.

History

The intention of the project was to revitalise the U.S. passenger cruise shipbuilding industry.  These ships were to be the largest cruise ships ever built in the U.S., with the first planned to enter service in early 2003.  As points of nostalgia and history, Ingalls delivered the last American-built large passenger ships, Brasil and Argentina, in 1958.

John McNeece and his company were engaged by American Classic Voyages as their consultant architects whose role was to plan and design the interior architecture and design of the leading vessel in the series. Construction began in June, 2000 but the bankruptcy of American Classic Voyages in October 2001 halted the project and left only the partially completed hull of the first ship, and parts and supplies for the second.

Original ship plans
The ships were planned to cruise within the Hawaiian Islands and were to represent the state-of-the-art in comfort and luxury. Each vessel was to feature a four-deck-high atrium, a 1,060-seat dining room, an 840-seat theater, a 590-seat cabaret lounge, and a "uniquely Hawaiian" outdoor performance stage.

Plans called for accommodations for 1,900 passengers which included 950 cabins, 77 percent of which were to be "outside cabins," and 64 percent of which were to have private balconies. In addition, the upper three decks of the ships were to be designed to "maximize the sense of spaciousness on board, and provide passengers with panoramic views of the Hawaiian Islands and the surrounding Pacific Ocean".

Eventual Completion

Norwegian Cruise Line's Involvement

In late 2002, Norwegian Cruise Line contracted Northrop Grumman Ship Systems, the owner of Ingalls, to buy all of the materials, equipment and work performed on the two Project America vessels.  All of the materials were towed to Germany and the first ship was completed at Lloyd Werft Shipyard in Bremerhaven.  The ship was lengthened as is now  plus additional exterior and interior changes were made.  This ship was named the Pride of America and entered service in 2005.

The materials for the second Project America ship were utilised in the construction of the Pride of Hawaii (now named Norwegian Jade), at Meyer Werft Shipyard in Papenburg.  Pride of Hawaii entered service in 2006 and is approximately  larger than Pride of America.

Passenger Vessel Services Act
In exchange for its purchase of the Project America materials, Norwegian Cruise Line lobbied heavily for an exception to the Passenger Vessel Services Act, which prohibits foreign built ships from operating between U.S. ports without making a foreign stop in between. The exception was granted and three ships (the aforementioned as well as Pride of Aloha), effectively all foreign built, were allowed to fly the U.S. flag.  This exception allows Norwegian Cruise Line to have an exclusive right to operate Hawaiian itineraries that do not need to touch a foreign port.  A caveat of this exception, however, requires Norwegian Cruise Line to staff these ships with a crew made up of predominantly U.S. citizens.

Goals
Project America was the result of the U.S.-Flag Cruise Ship Pilot Project Statute passed by Congress in 1997, designed to do the following:

Revitalise the U.S.-flag oceangoing cruise ship fleet
Create more than 5,000 American jobs
Help sustain and modernize the U.S. shipbuilding industrial base
Increase U.S. tax revenues
Boost Hawaii tourism
Expand consumers' leisure travel opportunities

Support
The Department of Defense and the U.S. Maritime Administration strongly supported the U.S.-Flag Ship Pilot Project.  The project enjoyed great political support from Mississippi’s U.S. Senators, Thad Cochran and Trent Lott, as well as U.S. Senator Daniel Inouye of Hawaii.

References

External links
 Project America rides again

Cruise ship classes
Cancelled ships